Paposa is a village in the Bhiwani district of the Indian state of Haryana. About 98% Jat population of the village paposa are ghanghas. In nearby villages, Paposa is known as Jaatland Village. , the village had 741 households with a population of 3,731 of which 2,021 were male and 1,710 female.

References

Villages in Bhiwani district